The plain-breasted earthcreeper (Upucerthia validirostris jelskii) is a bird in the family Furnariidae. It is found in Argentina, Bolivia, Chile, and Peru. Its natural habitats are subtropical or tropical high-altitude shrubland and subtropical or tropical high-altitude grassland. It has been lumped together with the buff-breasted earthcreeper based on song, continuous song, duet, and call.

References

Areta, J.I. & M. Pearman. 2013. Species limits and clinal variation in a widespread high Andean Furnariid: the Buff-breasted Earthcreeper (Upucerthia validirostris). Condor 115:131-143.

Upucerthia
Birds described in 1874
Birds of the Altiplano
Birds of Peru
Taxonomy articles created by Polbot